The Descent from the Cross is a painting by Peter Paul Rubens, executed around 1616–1617 for the chapel of the Capuchin convent in Lille, France. It was seized by France and was part of the founding collection of the Palais des Beaux-Arts de Lille, where it is still housed.

See also
 The Descent from the Cross (Rubens), for other paintings by Rubens of the same title

External links
The Descent from the Cross at the Palais des Beaux-Arts de Lille

1617 paintings
Paintings by Peter Paul Rubens
Rubens, 1617
Paintings of the Virgin Mary
Paintings in the collection of the Palais des Beaux-Arts de Lille